Colonus sylvanus is a species of jumping spider. It is found in a range from the United States to Panama.

References

External links
 

Salticidae
Spiders described in 1846